Baron Ernesto Cianciolo (1856–1905) was an Italian politician. He became sindaco (mayor) of Messina, Sicily, in 1887. From 10 December 1890 to 17 May 1900 he was a member of the Camera dei Deputati of the Parliament of the Kingdom of Italy, in the 17th, 18th, 19th and 20th legislatures.

References 

1856 births
1905 deaths
19th-century Italian politicians
Deputies of Legislature XVII of the Kingdom of Italy
Deputies of Legislature XVIII of the Kingdom of Italy
Deputies of Legislature XIX of the Kingdom of Italy
Deputies of Legislature XX of the Kingdom of Italy
Mayors of Messina